Krasny Partizan is a rural locality (a settlement) in Krasnooktyabrskoye Rural Settlement, Sredneakhtubinsky District, Volgograd Oblast, Russia. The population was 33 as of 2010.

Geography 
Krasny Partizan is located 65 km northeast of Srednyaya Akhtuba (the district's administrative centre) by road. Maksima Gorkogo is the nearest rural locality.

References 

Rural localities in Sredneakhtubinsky District